The Quarter Ton Cup is a sailing trophy awarded to the winners of the world Quarter Ton class championships between 1968 and 1997 and for the Quarter Ton Classic Revival from 2005 to present. The class fleet still sails on the Solent.

Winners 1968 - 1997

Quarter Ton Cup Past Winners

1997    Italy          Isola D'Elba (ITA)  

1996    Travemünde     PER ELISA (ITA)

1995    Gdynia         PER ELISA (ITA)
 
1994    Warnemunde     B & BV (ITA)

1993    Bayona         GEN-MAR (ITA)

1992    Chioggia       JONATHAN VI (ITA)

1991    Porto Carras   MARFRIO PIRANHA (I)

1990    Bayona         AVE (E)

1989    Falmouth       MERIDIAN (I)

1988    Travemünde     MCDONALDS (D)

1987    Crosshaven     MCDONALDS (D)

1986    Copenhagen     COMTE DE FLANDRES (KA)

1985    Ajaccio        ROYAL FLUSH (SA)

1984    Nieuwpoort     COMTE DE FLANDRES (F)

1982    Melbourne      QUARTERMASTER (KA)

1981    Marseille      LACYDON PROTIS (F)

1980    Panmure        BULLIT (F) 

1979    San Remo       BULLIT (F)

1978    Sajima         MAGICIAN V (J)

1977    Helsinki       MANZANITA (E)

1976    Corpus Christi MAGIC BUS (KZ)

1975    Deauville      45 SOUTH (KZ)

1974    Malmo          ACCENT (S)

1973    Weymouth       EYGTHENE (US)

1972    La Rochelle    PETITE FLEUR (F) 

1971    La Rochelle    TEQUILA (F)

1970    Travemünde     FLEUR D'ECUME (F)

1969    Breskens       LISTANG (G)

1968    Breskens       PIRHANA (H)

1967    La Rochelle    DEFENDER (B)

Winners 2005 - 2019

2019       Cowes           PROTIS (GBR) J Fauroux

2018       Cowes           AGUILA (GBR) Judel Vrolijk

2017       Cowes           AGUILA (GBR) Judel Vrolijk

2016       Cowes           BULLIT (GBR)  J Fauroux

2015       Cowes           BULLIT (GBR)  J Fauroux

2014       Cowes           BULLIT (GBR)  J Fauroux

2013       Cowes           ESPADA (GBR) Bruce Farr

2012       Cowes           BULLIT (GBR) J Fauroux

2011       Cowes           ESPADA (GBR) Bruce Farr

2010       Cowes           COTE (ESP) Pepe Gonzalez

2009       Cowes           ANCHOR CHALLENGE (GBR) Bruce Farr

2008       Cowes           TOM BOMBADIL (GBR) Doug Peterson

2007       Cowes           ESPADA (GBR)  Bruce Farr

2006       Cowes           ENIGMA (GBR)  Ed Dubois

2005       Cowes           PURPLE HAZE (GBR) David Thomas

References
 http://quartertonclass.org/index.php?option=com_content&view=article&id=75&Itemid=469
 http://www.histoiredeshalfs.com/Quarter%20Tonner/Q%20Ceccarelli%20Agr.htm

External links

Sailing competitions